Lehigh County (Pennsylvania Dutch: Lechaa Kaundi) is a county in the Commonwealth of Pennsylvania. As of the 2020 census, the county's population was 374,557. Its county seat is Allentown, the state's third largest city after Philadelphia and Pittsburgh.

Lehigh County and Northampton County to its east combine to form the Lehigh Valley region of eastern Pennsylvania. Lehigh County is one of the fastest-growing counties in Pennsylvania and the more highly populated of the two counties. Both counties are part of the Philadelphia television market, the fourth largest television market in the nation.

The county is named for the Lehigh River, a  tributary of the Delaware River, which flows through Lehigh County. The Lehigh River served a vital role in the county's development by offering a transportation and trading route for its mining products, including iron, manganese, limestone, and ultimately manufactured steel products.

Lehigh County falls geographically between two Pennsylvania Appalachian mountain ridges, Blue Mountain to the county's north and South Mountain to its south.

History

Settlement and founding
Lehigh County was first settled around 1730 and was formed in 1812 when Northampton County was divided into two counties. The county is named after the Lehigh River, a  river that runs through the county and whose name is derived from the Lenape Indian term Lechauweki or Lechauwekink, meaning "where there are forks." Shelter House, constructed in Emmaus in 1734 by Pennsylvania German settlers, is the oldest continuously occupied structure in both Lehigh County and Lehigh Valley and among the oldest still-standing building structures in the U.S. state of Pennsylvania.

American Revolution

Some of the first resistance to British colonialism, which led ultimately to the American Revolutionary War, began in present day Lehigh County. On December 21, 1774, patriots in the area formed one of the colonies' first Committee of Observations. Following the Declaration of Independence, patriot militas pressured Tories out of Allentown and the surrounding area, and the colonial government in the area began to break down.

After Washington and the Continental Army were defeated at the Battle of Brandywine on September 11, 1777, the revolutionary capital of Philadelphia was left defenseless and Pennsylvania's Supreme Executive Council ordered that eleven Philadelphia bells, including the Liberty Bell (then known as the State House Bell), be taken down and moved to present day Allentown (then called Northampton Towne) and hidden in the basement of Zion Reformed Church on present day West Hamilton Street to protect them from being melting down by the British Army for use as munitions. The Liberty Bell's successful protection in Allentown is commemorated in the Liberty Bell Museum, located in Zion Reformed Church in Allentown.

Industrial Revolution
The opening of the Lehigh Canal beginning in 1827 transformed Allentown and Lehigh County from a rural agricultural area dominated by German-speaking people into an urbanized industrialized area and expanded the city's commercial and industrial capacity greatly. With this, Lehigh County underwent significant industrialization, ultimately becoming a major 20th century center for heavy industry and manufacturing and one of several hubs for the Industrial Revolution.

American Civil War

Following the Union Army's defeat at the Battle of Fort Sumter and Lincoln's April 15, 1861 proclamation calling for state militia to provide 75,000 volunteer troops to defend the nation's capital of Washington, D.C., Allentown deployed the Allen Infantry, also known as the Allen Guards and composed of volunteers from Allentown and its surrounding suburbs. The unit mustered in for duty on April 18, 1861. As the Civil War progressed, multiple Union Army units were drawn from Lehigh County, including roughly seventy percent of the 47th Pennsylvania Infantry Regiment. 

On October 19, 1899, a monument in honor of the Lehigh County men killed in their volunteer service to preservation of the Union, the Soldiers and Sailors Monument, was erected at Seventh and Hamilton Streets in Center City Allentown where it still stands.

Geography

Topography

Lehigh County borders two Appalachian mountain ridges.

Lehigh County is part of the Delaware River watershed. Most of the county is drained by the Lehigh River and its tributaries, though the Schuylkill River also drains regions in the county's south through Perkiomen Creek and (in the county's northwest) through Maiden Creek.

Adjacent counties
Berks County (west)
Bucks County (southeast)
Carbon County (north)
Montgomery County (south) 
Northampton County (northeast)
Schuylkill County (northwest)

Climate

Lehigh County's climate falls in the humid continental climate zone. The variety is hot-summer (Dfa) except in the county's higher elevation areas, where it is warm-summer (Dfb). Summers are typically hot and muggy, fall and spring are generally mild, and winter is cold. Precipitation is almost uniformly distributed throughout the year.

In Allentown, January lows average  and highs average . July lows average  and highs average  with an average relative humidity of 82%. Early fall and mid-winter are generally driest with October being the driest month with only 74.7 mm of average precipitation.

Snowfall is variable with some winters bringing light snow and others bringing numerous significant snowstorms.

Demographics

As of the 2020 census, the county's population was 374,557. The county's population growth of 7.2% since 2010 is among the fastest in the state. The racial makeup of the county, as of the 2020 census, was 60.8% White, 26% Hispanic or Latino, 6.12% Black or African American, 3.66% Asian, 3.33% from other or mixed races, 0.02% Pacific Islander, and 0.1% Native American.

Politics and government
As of November 7, 2022, there were 245,784 registered voters in Lehigh County:

Democratic: 115,206 (46.87%)
Republican: 84,397 (34.34%)
 No affiliation: 37,990 (15.46%)
 Other parties: 8,191 (3.33%)

Lehigh County and neighboring Northampton County are part of Pennsylvania's 7th Congressional district. The 7th Congressional district is a contentious swing district with neither Republicans nor Democrats winning the district consistently.  Voters elected Republican Charlie Dent in 2004, 2006, and 2008 and, previously, Republican Pat Toomey in 1998, 2000, and 2002. In 2004, the county narrowly voted for John Kerry over George W. Bush for President. In 2008, all statewide Democratic candidates won the county with significant leads and, in the presidential election, Barack Obama won the county, 57.1% to 41.5%, over John McCain. In the 2012 presidential election, Obama again carried the county but by a narrower margin, 53.17% to 45.52%.

|}

State House of Representatives

State Senate

U.S. House of Representatives
 Susan Wild, Democrat, Pennsylvania's 7th congressional district

Education

4-year colleges and universities
Cedar Crest College, Allentown
DeSales University, Center Valley
Muhlenberg College, Allentown
Penn State Lehigh Valley, Center Valley

2-year colleges and technical institutes
Baum School of Art, Allentown
Lehigh Carbon Community College, Schnecksville (main campus), and Donley Center, Allentown (satellite campus)
Lincoln Tech, Allentown

Public school districts
Allentown School District
William Allen High School, Allentown
Louis E. Dieruff High School, Allentown
Francis D. Raub Middle School, Allentown
Harrison-Morton Middle School, Allentown
South Mountain Middle School, Allentown
Trexler Middle School, Allentown
Catasauqua Area School District
Catasauqua High School, Northampton
Catasauqua Middle School, Catasauqua
East Penn School District
Emmaus High School, Emmaus
Eyer Middle School, Macungie
Lower Macungie Middle School, Macungie
Northern Lehigh School District
Northern Lehigh High School, Slatington
Northern Lehigh Middle School, Slatington
Northwestern Lehigh School District
Northwestern Lehigh High School, New Tripoli
Northwestern Lehigh Middle School, New Tripoli
Parkland School District
Parkland High School, South Whitehall Township
Orefield Middle School, Orefield
Springhouse Middle School, Allentown
Salisbury Township School District
Salisbury High School, Salisbury Township
Salisbury Middle School, Allentown 
Southern Lehigh School District
Southern Lehigh High School, Center Valley
Southern Lehigh Middle School, Center Valley
Whitehall-Coplay School District
Whitehall High School, Whitehall Township
Whitehall-Coplay Middle School, Whitehall Township

Public charter schools
Lincoln Leadership Academy Charter School, Allentown 
Roberto Clemente Charter School, Allentown 
Seven Generations Charter School, Emmaus

Private high schools
Allentown Central Catholic High School, Allentown
Salem Christian School, Macungie

Vocational high school
Lehigh Career and Technical Institute, Schnecksville

Transportation and infrastructure

Air

Lehigh County's primary commercial airport is Lehigh Valley International Airport , located in Hanover Township in the county. The county is also served by Allentown Queen City Municipal Airport, a two-runway general aviation facility located off Lehigh Street in Allentown used predominantly by private aviation.

Bus

Public bus service in Lehigh County is available through the Lehigh and Northampton Transportation Authority, known as LANTA. Several private bus lines, including Trans-Bridge Lines, provide bus service from Allentown to New York City's Port Authority Bus Terminal, Philadelphia's Greyhound Terminal and 30th Street Station, Atlantic City's Bus Terminal, and other regional locations.

Major highways

Cedar Crest Boulevard
Lehigh Street
Tilghman Street

Media

Newspapers
The Morning Call (in Allentown), The Express-Times (in Easton), and The Times News (in Lehighton) each cover Lehigh County.

Radio
Lehigh County-area radio stations include WAEB-AM in Allentown (talk and news), B104 in Allentown (contemporary hits), WZZO in Bethlehem (classic rock), WHOL in Allentown (rhythmic contemporary), and others. Some major New York City stations and every major Philadelphia station are received in the county.

Television
Lehigh County is part of the Philadelphia broadcast media market, the nation's fourth largest media market. Numerous New York City radio and television stations are also carried in the county. Three television stations are based in the county, WBPH-TV Channel 60, WLVT Channel 39 (the Lehigh Valley's PBS affiliate), and WFMZ Channel 69 (an independent television station).

The four major Philadelphia-based network stations serving Lehigh County are KYW-TV (the CBS affiliate), WCAU (the NBC affiliate), WPVI (the ABC affiliate), and WTXF (the Fox affiliate). The four major New York City-based network stations serving Lehigh County are WABC (the ABC affiliate), WCBS-TV (the CBS affiliate), WNBC (the NBC affiliate), and WNYW (the Fox affiliate). The four major Scranton-Wilkes-Barre-based network stations serving Lehigh County are WNEP-TV (the ABC affiliate), WBRE-TV (the NBC affiliate), WYOU (the CBS affiliate), and WOLF-TV (the Fox affiliate).

Telecommunications

From 1947 until 1994, Lehigh County was served exclusively by the 215 area code. With the county's growing population, area code 610 was also allocated to the county in 1994. Today, Lehigh County is covered largely by the 610 area code. An overlay area code, 484, was added to the 610 service area in 1999. A plan to introduce area code 835 as an additional overlay was rescinded in 2001. It has since been reintroduced and will begin use once 610 and 484 extensions are exhausted, possibly as early as September 2022.

Recreation

Amusement parks

Dorney Park & Wildwater Kingdom, one of the largest amusement and water parks on the U.S. East Coast, is located in South Whitehall Township in the county. It is open May through the end of October.

Fairs and festivals

The Great Allentown Fair, one of the nation's largest and longest ongoing city fairs, is held annually at Allentown Fairgrounds on North 17th Street in Allentown the end of August and beginning of September. Mayfair, an arts and festival fair, is held annually in May on the campus of Cedar Crest College in Allentown.

Golf

Lehigh County is home to multiple golf courses, including Brookside Country Club in Macungie, Lehigh Country Club on Cedar Crest Boulevard in Allentown, Olde Homestead Golf Club in New Tripoli, Saucon Valley Country Club in Upper Saucon Township, Shepherd Hills Golf Club in Wescosville, and Wedgewood Golf Course in Coopersburg.

Museums and history
The county has several museums, including Allentown Art Museum, America on Wheels, Da Vinci Science Center, George Taylor House, Jacob Ehrenhardt Jr. House, Lehigh County Historical Society at Trout Hall, Liberty Bell Museum, Museum of Indian Culture, and others.

Parks and zoo

Lehigh Valley Zoo is located in Schnecksville in the county and is open year-round. Lehigh County also has  of public parks, including:

Lehigh Parkway in Allentown, a  city-owned park along Little Lehigh Creek. 
Lock Ridge Park in Alburtis, a  county-owned park along Swabia Creek that includes the Lock Ridge Furnace Museum. 
Trexler Nature Preserve in North Whitehall Township, a  county-owned park along Jordan Creek, which includes the Lehigh Valley Zoo.
Whitehall Parkway in Whitehall Township, a  township-owned park connected to the  Ironton Rail Trail.

Communities

 

Under Pennsylvania law, there are four types of incorporated municipalities: cities, boroughs, townships, and, in only one case, towns. The following cities, boroughs, and townships are located in Lehigh County:

Cities

Allentown (county seat)
Bethlehem (mostly in Northampton County)

Boroughs

Alburtis
Catasauqua
Coopersburg
Coplay
Emmaus
Fountain Hill
Macungie
Slatington

Townships

Hanover Township
Heidelberg Township
Lower Macungie Township
Lower Milford Township
Lowhill Township
Lynn Township
North Whitehall Township
Salisbury Township
South Whitehall Township
Upper Macungie Township
Upper Milford Township
Upper Saucon Township
Washington Township
Weisenberg Township
Whitehall Township

Census-designated places
Census-designated places are geographical areas designated by the U.S. Census Bureau for the purposes of compiling demographic data. They are not actual jurisdictions under Pennsylvania law. Other unincorporated communities, such as villages, may be listed here as well.

Ancient Oaks
Breinigsville
Cementon
Cetronia
DeSales University
Dorneyville
Egypt
Fullerton
Hokendauqua
Laurys Station
New Tripoli
Schnecksville
Slatedale
Stiles
Trexlertown
Wescosville

Unincorporated communities

 Balliettsville
 Best Station
 Center Valley
 Colesville
 Eagle Point
 East Texas
 Emerald
 Fogelsville
 Friedensville
 Gauff Hill
 Germansville
 Hensingersville
 Hosensack
 Ironton
 Jacksonville
 Kuhnsville
 Lanark
 Limeport
 Locust Valley
 Lynnport
 Mickleys
 Neffs
 New Smithville
 Old Zionsville
 Orefield
 Pleasant Corners
 Powder Valley
 Scherersville
 Schoenersville
 Shimerville
 Sigmund
 Summit Lawn
 Vera Cruz
 Walbert
 Wanamakers
 Werleys Corner
 West Catasauqua
 Zionsville

Population ranking
Lehigh County's largest cities, townships, boroughs, and other communities, based on the 2020 census, include:

† county seat

Notable people

Since its founding in 1812, Lehigh County has been the birthplace or home to several notable Americans, including:

Chuck Bednarik, former professional football player, Philadelphia Eagles, and 1967 Pro Football Hall of Fame inductee
Stephen Vincent Benét, former novelist
Michaela Conlin, stage and television actress, Bones
Lee Iacocca, former president and chief executive officer of Chrysler 
Keith Jarrett, jazz musician
Michael Johns, healthcare executive and former White House presidential speechwriter
Billy Kidman, former professional wrestler
Carson Kressley, Emmy-winning fashion designer, Bravo's Queer Eye
Rose Lambert, former American missionary and witness of the 1909 Adana massacre of Armenians 
Varvara Lepchenko, professional tennis player
Lil Peep, former American emo rapper, singer, and songwriter 
Matt Millen, former professional football player, Oakland Raiders, San Francisco 49ers, and Washington Redskins, and former president and general manager, Detroit Lions
Andre Reed, former professional football player, Buffalo Bills and Washington Redskins, and 2014 Pro Football Hall of Fame inductee
John O. Sheatz, former Pennsylvania state representative, state senator, and state treasurer from 1908–11
Amanda Seyfried, actress, Veronica Mars, Big Love, Mamma Mia!, and Les Misérables
Curt Simmons, former professional baseball player, California Angels, Chicago Cubs, Philadelphia Phillies, and St. Louis Cardinals
Eric Steckel, blues singer, guitarist, songwriter, and record producer
Dana Snyder, film and television actor, Aqua Teen Hunger Force
Christine Taylor, actress and wife of actor Ben Stiller
Lauren Weisberger, author of The Devil Wears Prada

References

External links

Lehigh County news at Lehigh Valley Live
"Famous People from the Lehigh Valley," The Morning Call, August 18, 2006

 
1812 establishments in Pennsylvania
Lehigh Valley
Populated places established in 1812